"It Keeps Right On a-Hurtin'" is a song written and recorded by Johnny Tillotson, which was a major hit for him in 1962. It has been recorded by many other artists.

Notable cover versions
Bobby Darin - You're the Reason I'm Living (1963).
Shelley Fabares - The Things We Did Last Summer (1962).
Dean Martin - My Woman, My Woman, My Wife (1970).
Billy Joe Royal - a single release in 1988.
Elvis Presley - From Elvis in Memphis (1969).
Margaret Whiting - a single release in 1968. Included in her album Pop Country (1967).
Slim Whitman - Country Songs / City Hits (1964).
Wanda Jackson - Encore (2021).

Chart performance

Johnny Tillotson

Margaret Whiting

Billy Joe Royal

References

Elvis Presley songs
Johnny Tillotson songs
Billy Joe Royal songs
Songs written by Johnny Tillotson
1962 songs
1962 singles
1968 singles
1988 singles
Cadence Records singles